The Premio Carlo Vittadini is a Group 3 flat horse race in Italy open to thoroughbreds aged three years or older. It is run at Milan over a distance of 1,600 metres (about 1 mile), and it is scheduled to take place each year in late May or early June.

The event was formerly known as the Premio Emilio Turati. It was renamed in memory of Carlo Vittadini (1915–2007), a successful racehorse owner, in 2008.

The Premio Carlo Vittadini is currently held at the same meeting as the Oaks d'Italia. The race was downgraded from Group 2 to Group 3 in 2016.

Records
Most successful horse since 1960 (2 wins):
 Chiese – 1965, 1966
 Misil – 1991, 1992
 Pressing – 2009, 2010
 Kaspersky - 2015, 2016

Leading jockey since 1986 (4 wins):
 Gianfranco Dettori – Svelt (1987), Jurado (1988), Misil (1991, 1992)
 Mirco Demuro – Stanott (1999), Marbye (2004), Nordhal (2005), Worthadd (2011)

Leading trainer since 1986 (3 wins):
 Alduino Botti – Svelt (1987), Jurado (1988), Ramonti (2006)
 Vittorio Caruso – Misil (1991, 1992), Worthadd (2011)
 Edmondo Botti - Principe Adepto (2013), Kaspersky (2015, 2016)

Winners since 1986

Earlier winners

 1956: Barbara Sirani
 1960: Malhoa
 1961: Rio Marin
 1962: Angri
 1963: Rockstone
 1964: Doney
 1965: Chiese
 1966: Chiese
 1967: Prince Tady
 1968: Ognon
 1969: Montevideo
 1970: Stefano di Cracovia
 1971: Lascro
 1972: Alcamo
 1973: Brook
 1974: Wayne
 1975: Baly Rockette
 1976: Shamsan
 1977: Kronenkranich
 1978: Capo Bon
 1979: Fatusael
 1980: Isopach
 1981: Peloponnes
 1982: Stifelius
 1983: Bold Run
 1984: Mount Bidder
 1985: King of Clubs

See also
 List of Italian flat horse races

References

 Racing Post:

 galopp-sieger.de – Premio Carlo Vittadini (ex Premio Emilio Turati).
 horseracingintfed.com – International Federation of Horseracing Authorities – Premio Carlo Vittadini (2016).
 pedigreequery.com – Premio Emilio Turati – Milano San Siro.

Horse races in Italy
Open mile category horse races
Sport in Milan